The Civil Order of Savoy was founded as an order of knighthood  in 1831 by the King of Sardinia, Charles Albert, Duke of Savoy. The intention was to reward those virtues not belonging to the existing Military Order of Savoy, founded by Vittorio Emanuele I in 1815. The order has one degree, that of Knight (Cavalieri dell'Ordine civile di Savoia), and is limited to 70 members. Admission is in the personal gift of the head of the House of Savoy.

The insignia bears the inscription Al Merito Civile—1831; the letters C.A. on the reverse substituted for V.E. after the death of Charles Albert in 1849.

The civil order was continued on the unification of Italy in 1861, but has been suppressed by law since the foundation of the Republic in 1946. Umberto II did not abdicate his position as fons honorum however, and the now dynastic order remains under the Grand Mastership of the head of the former Royal house. While the continued use of those decorations awarded prior to 1951 is permitted in Italy, they no longer confer any right of precedence in official ceremonies. The military order on the other hand, was revived as the Military Order of Italy and remains a national order today.

Recipients 

 Prince Aimone, Duke of Aosta
 Luigi Calori
 Prince Vittorio Emanuele, Count of Turin

See also
List of Italian orders of knighthood
Order of the Crown of Italy

References

External links
 Ordini dinastici della Real Casa di Savoia 

1831 establishments in the Kingdom of Sardinia
1831 establishments in Italy
Awards established in 1831
House of Savoy